Eastman may refer to:

People
 Eastman (surname)
 Eastman Nixon Jacobs (1902–1987), American aerodynamicist
 John Eastman (b 1960), American lawyer and founding director of the Center for Constitutional Jurisprudence
 Jonathan Eastman Johnson (1824–1906), American painter
 George Eastman (1854-1932), American entrepreneur who founded the Eastman Kodak Company
 Lester Fuess Eastman (1928-2013), American physicist, engineer and educator.

Places

Canada
 Eastman Region, Manitoba
 Eastman, Quebec, a municipality

United States
 Eastman, Georgia, a city
 Eastman, Wisconsin, a village
 Eastman (town), Wisconsin
 Eastman Pond, New Hampshire

Elsewhere
 Eastman (crater), on Mercury

Other
 Eastman School of Music
Eastman Theatre
Eastman Wind Ensemble
 Eastman Color Negative
 Eastman Chemical Company
 Eastman Dental Hospital
UCL Eastman Dental Institute
 Eastman Gang, last of New York's street gangs which dominated the city's underworld during the late 1890s until the early 1910s
 Eastmaninstitutet, a dental care centre in Stockholm, Sweden, founded by donations from George Eastman
 Eastman Kodak
 Edinburgh and Stirling Metropolitan Area Network

See also
 Osterman